Mount Bradley is a pyramidal peak,  high, at the southeast end of a ridge descending from Detroit Plateau, surmounting Znepole Ice Piedmont to the east and Dreatin Glacier to the southwest. It was charted in 1945 by the Falkland Islands Dependencies Survey, who named it for K.G. Bradley, Colonial Secretary in the Falkland Islands at the time.

Map
 Trinity Peninsula. Scale 1:250000 topographic map No. 5697. Institut für Angewandte Geodäsie and British Antarctic Survey, 1996.

References 

 SCAR Composite Antarctic Gazetteer.

Mountains of Trinity Peninsula